Mount Blunt is a rounded ice-covered mountain (1,500 m) rising from the west flank of Weyerhaeuser Glacier, on the east side of Antarctic Peninsula.

Based on peakery data, it ranks as the 1697th highest mountain in Antarctica.

The mountain was photographed from the air by the United States Antarctic Service (USAS) on September 28, 1940. It was roughly surveyed by Falkland Islands Dependencies Survey (FIDS) in December 1958, and resurveyed in November 1960.

It was named by the United Kingdom Antarctic Place-Names Committee (UK-APC) after Edmund Blunt (1770–1862), American publisher of charts and sailing directions, whose establishment was acquired by U.S. Government to form the nucleus of the U.S. Hydrographic Office (since 1972, the Defense Mapping Agency Hydrographic Center).

See also
Eisner Peak

References

Mountains of Graham Land
Bowman Coast